Squadron Sport Ranger ( Khop-won-kaan So-pot-reen-choe) is a Thai live-action superhero television series similar to the Japanese Super Sentai and the American Power Rangers franchises. It premiered on August 6, 2006 and aired on Thai Channel 3. Much like each Super Sentai and Power Rangers series has an overall theme (mythology, dinosaurs, magic, etc.), Sport Rangers theme is sports, which each of the Sport Rangers has a specialty in.

The second season of the show, titled Sport Ranger 2 (Thai: ขบวนการ สปอร์ตเรนเจอร์ 2), premiered on Channel 3 on February 5, 2012.

Plot
Starhunter is an alien tribe that steals all life energy on other planets, gathering the energy in the sixth dimension using "King Medal" and bringing it under their control. Soon they created "Knight Medal" when "King Medal" was not able to absorb all the energy. Hoping to conquer the Earth in one fell swoop, since they believed it would not offer much resistance, they brought along both medals. Fortunately, the ship carrying both medals got hit by crossfire in a war that was going on down on Earth. The medals were lost as the ship exploded in Siberia. Starhunter was forced to retreat and create new medals.

One of the medals was broken into 5 pieces. The broken medal was taken by researchers headed by Dr. Earth, and the complete medal was taken by Dr. Heart. One day, Heart's research lab exploded and the medal was nowhere to be found. Later Dr. Earth realized that monsters that had begun to appear were humans that had absorbed the energy from the missing medal when the lab exploded.

Upon further research, Dr. Earth created "SportDetector" to control the 5 broken pieces and special suits to utilize each piece's unique power. He gave five youngsters the suits to stop these monsters.

Meanwhile, Starhunter is preparing their new invasion of Earth.

At the end of the first season's finale, the three male Sport Rangers (Ace, Up, and New) sacrifice themselves to destroy the evil's palace.

Sport Searching School

Sport Rangers
Ace (เอส) / Boxing Red: Powered by light.  Corresponds to courage, determination. Former amateur boxer who was recruited to be the leader of the Sport Rangers. At first he had doubts, but he soon joined the others in battle.
Roll call: "The power of a determined fist!"
Weapon: Thunder Fist
Ice (ไอซ์) / Boxing Red II: Leader in season 2.
Up (อัพ) / Soccer Yellow: Powered by electricity.  Corresponds to creativity, wisdom. Former soccer player who acts as second in command. He is serious about the Sport Rangers' duty and often takes charge of the team.
Roll call: "The power of wise creativity!"
Weapon: Power Ball
Ball (บอล) / Soccer Yellow II
New (นิว) / Tennis Green: Powered by heart.  Corresponds to enthusiasm, cheerfulness. Former tennis player who is playful and flirtatious. He seems to have some knowledge of English.
Roll call: "The power of an agile mind!"
Weapon: Racquet Sword
Ten (เทน) / Tennis Green II: Second in command in season 2.
Yu (ยู) / Swimming Blue: Powered by water.  Corresponds to endurance, perseverance. Former swimmer who is like a caring older sister to her teammates and friends.
Roll call: "The power of surging water!"
Weapon: Double Cut Fin
May (เมย์) / Gymnastic Pink: Powered by wind.  Corresponds to kindheartedness, mercy.  A former gymnast that may seem shy and withdrawn, but she has used her girlish figure to distract enemies.
Roll call: "The power of gentle vigor!"
Weapon: Maya Ribbon

Assistance
Doctor Earth (ดร.เอิร์ธ) / Debola : Lead scientist of SSS; mentor to the Sport Rangers. He is responsible for creating all of the Sport Rangers' equipment.
Darling (ดาร์ลิ่ง): Support A.I. of SSS.
Hanuman (หนุมาน) : New Support A.I.

Other characters
 Po-Po: A clumsy photographer and friend of Ace.
 Uncle Cherry: An absent-minded man who runs a drink stand that the Sport Rangers often visit.
 Marine: (104) Yu's younger adopted sister. She was envious of Yu's swimming abilities, so she took a dark medal and transformed into a monster.
 Maria: (105, 106) A tennis player and friend of New. She has an allergy to sunlight that causes her vision to become blurred.
Tone: (107) May's ex-boyfriend that had a dependence on drugs. He was captured and was forcibly put under the control of a dark medal.
Professor Josh: (109, 110) A former member of SSS who left to coach a basketball team after a dispute. Dr. Earth sought him out to help in the development of the Spirit Robo.

Starhunter
Starhunter are the main antagonists of the series.
Queen (ราชินีนางพญา)
Lord of the 3rd (ลอร์ดรุ่นที่ 3)
General Tosa (เจเนอรัล โทซ่า)
Sit-thi (มอนสเคาท์ / สิทธิ์)
Matee-er (เมธิเออร์)
Gib-Giew Soldiers (ทหารระดับล่าง กิ๊บกิ้ว)

Monsters 
Season 1:
Krotha Mountain monster (101-102)
Octopus monster (103)
Bird monster (Marine) (104) 
Spike monster (Matina) (105-106)
Hula Hoop monster (Tone) (107)
Laser monster (108)
Buffalo monster (109)
Syringe monster (107, 110)
Hip Hop Monster (Champ) (111)
Seeker Ranger (112)
Zip monster (113)
Frog monster (114)
Butterfly monster (115)

Arsenal
Sport Detector: The team's transformation device. It is worn on the wrist and can be used as a communicator that is able to receive calls from ordinary phones. To transform, the Sport Rangers call out "Sport charge up! Change!". The Sport Detector is also able to summon their weapons when a medallion is inserted.
Sport Early Warning System (S.E.W.): A system developed in the seventh episode to help detect monsters created by the dark medals more quickly.

Weapons/Attacks
Star Gate Judgmentation: The team's first finishing attack. Capable of being used with only four members in episode 1, but not as effective.  After Boxing Red joined the team in episode 2, they used it again to finish Krotha Mountain monster.
Super Attack Ball: The team's second finishing attack, received in episode 3. To be summoned, Soccer Yellow throws a medal into the sky and the Super Attack Ball descends from the Moon. It is then passed from member to member and Boxing Red punches it into the enemy. The Sport Rangers' first attempt to use the Super Attack Ball was unsuccessful, they were unable to smoothly pass it to each other. To improve on their teamwork, they lined up with their legs strapped to the person next to them and tried to run together. With their new team skills, they were able to complete the combination attack during their second try.

Mecha
 Spirit Robo: The team's giant mecha that is composed of the five Spirit Fighters. It was developed by Dr. Earth with the assistance of Professor Josh in episode 10. Its main weapon is the sword, which performs its finishing move which is called the Meteor Storm Slash. The Spirit Robo is similar to several recent Super Sentai combining robos & Power Ranger Megazords (starting with the Senpuujin from "Ninpuu Sentai Hurricanger" in 2002 & Storm Megazord from Power Rangers Ninja Storm in 2003) in that the Sport Rangers remain in their individual cockpits rather coming together into a single cockpit when the combination is formed.
 Spirit Fighter Lead: Boxing Red's vehicle that forms the chest.
 Spirit Fighter Brain: Soccer Yellow's vehicle that forms the legs.
 Spirit Fighter Heart: Tennis Green's vehicle that forms the right arm.
 Spirit Fighter Strong: Swimming Blue's vehicle that forms the left arm and the shield.
 Spirit Fighter Base: Gymnastic Pink's vehicle that forms the torso, the sword, and the head.

Cast
 Ronnarid Gnampattanapongchai (รณริชช์ งามพัฒนพงศ์ชัย)— Boxing Red (Season 1)
 Worawat Lorattanachon (วรวัฒน์ ล้อรัตนชน) - Boxing Red (Season 2)
 Boonyarit Doojphibulpol (บุญญฤทธิ์ ดุจพิบูลย์ผล) — Soccer Yellow (Season 1)
 Thonthon Sawatkon (ธนธร ศวัสกร) - Soccer Yellow (Season 2)
 Todsapon Maaisuk (ทศพล หมายสุข) — Tennis Green (Season 1)
 Natchara Nuntaphodej (ณัชร นันทโพธิ์เดช) - Tennis Green (Season 2)
 Woranan Jantararatchamee (วรนันท์ จันทรรัศมี) — Swimming Blue
 Nidchashiita Jaruwat (นิจชิตา จารุวัฒน์) — Gymnastic Pink (Season 1)
Kanchana Wongcharoen (กาญจนา วงศ์เจริญ)- Gymnastic Pink (Season 2)
 Jerry Fransis Angus (เจอร์รี่ ฟรานซิส แองกุส) — Doctor Earth

Music
Opening/Ending
 Sport Ranger theme

Incidental
 Taken from Die Hard with a Vengeance

See also
Super Sentai
Power Rangers

External links
Official Sport Ranger Site 

Martial arts television series
Thai action television series
Tokusatsu television series
2006 Thai television series debuts
2012 Thai television series endings
2010s Thai television series
Television series by Broadcast Thai Television